John Fisher, 1st Baron Fisher (1841–1920) was a British Admiral of the Fleet. Admiral Fisher''' may also refer to:

Charles W. Fisher Jr. (1880–1971), U.S. Navy rear admiral
Douglas Fisher (Royal Navy officer) (1890–1963), British Royal Navy admiral
Frederic Fisher (1851–1943), British Royal Navy admiral
William Fisher (Royal Navy officer) (1780–1852), British Royal Navy rear admiral
William Blake Fisher (1853–1926), British Royal Navy admiral
William Wordsworth Fisher (1875–1937), British Royal Navy admiral

See also
Olfert Fas Fischer (1700–1761), Royal Dano-Norwegian Navy vice admiral
Olfert Fischer (1747–1829), Royal Dano-Norwegian Navy vice admiral